Mel Lastman Square is a public square at North York Civic Centre in Toronto, Ontario, Canada. It is named after then North York mayor (and later Toronto mayor) Mel Lastman. It was officially opened on June 16, 1989 by Norman Jewison and Mel Lastman's granddaughter Brie Lastman. The architects were J. Michael Kirkland.

The square hosts a variety of activities throughout the year, but is primarily a quiet space in which to relax or eat lunch.

History
The Square is located on what once was a "500-foot deep grassy field that served no apparent purpose other than to make City Hall hard to reach."  The square was named after Lastman in a motion brought forth by Howard Moscoe at a city council meeting in April 1986. Architect Michael Kirkland felt the overuse of concrete made the square feel "chintzy"; he would have used granite had the budget allowed for it. The Square cost $5 million to build.

The opening ceremony on June 16th was attended by 3500 people, flanked by a choir and a giant inflatable King Kong on a nearby rooftop. Lincoln Alexander and Alan Tonks were present at the ceremony. Finally, MP Alan Redway read a tribute from Brian Mulroney and 7000 balloons were released. 

Surrounded by Yonge Street on the east, the Toronto District School Board headquarters on the south, North York Civic Centre on the west, and to the north by the North York Central Library and North York Centre shopping/office/hotel complex (5150 Yonge Street), Mel Lastman Square was intended to be the heart of North York. With its sunken configuration and tree cover, activities can take place away from the busy traffic on Yonge Street.

An artificial stream runs from a fountain under a large sign at Yonge Street down into a large concrete square. Planters, trees, shrubs and wooden benches surround the area. A large pond is located in the centre of the square that serves as a relaxing focal point in the summer and a skating rink in the winter.

The square also features an outdoor theatre for a number of events, including Sunday Serenades jazz concerts each summer. Other events include RBC Run for the Kids, a farmer's market, cultural festivals, Canada Day festivities and numerous family events.

The family of one of the victims of the Toronto van attack donated a piano in April 2019 to the square. It has been placed under a rotunda at Mel Lastman Square.

See also

 Dempsey Store (North York)
 Gibson House
 Nathan Phillips Square
 Albert Campbell Square
 Pecaut Square

References

External links

Mel Lastman Square - Community Events 

Music venues in Toronto
Squares in Toronto
Buildings and structures in Toronto
North York